The White Hoods: an Historical Romance is a historical novel by Anna Eliza Bray first published in 1828 in London.

External links
 Synopsis of the novel

1828 British novels
Historical novels